The Asinger-reaction (sometimes referred to as the Asinger-4 component reaction or A-4CR for short) is a multicomponent reaction for the synthesis of 3-thiazolines and other related heterocycles. It is named after Friedrich Asinger who first reported it in 1956.

Process
An α-halogenated carbonyl-component reacts with sodium hydrosulfide (NaSH) and forms a Thiol in situ. The thiol reacts directly with another carbonyl component and ammonia to form a thiazoline. The reaction works also by using elemental sulphur, an α–substituted ketone, another carbonyl component and ammonia; in this case, a mixture of products is formed.

The formation of 3-thiazolines also occurs by using α-thioaldehyde or α-thioketone and ammonia.

A simplified route of the Asinger-reaction was developed at Degussa. An α-halogenated carbonyl compound reacts with sodium hydrosulfide (NaSH) and forms a Thiol in situ which reacts directly with aldehydes or ketones and ammonia to 3-thiazolines. The chemical industry developed based on the Asinger-reaction multi stage processes for the production of pharmaceuticals like D-Penicillamine and the aminoacid DL-cysteine.

References

Literature

Multiple component reactions
Name reactions
Heterocycle forming reactions
Sulfur heterocycle forming reactions
Nitrogen heterocycle forming reactions